Limba (Malimba, Mulimba) is a Bantu language of Cameroon. It is very closely related to Duala. Speakers report some degree of mutual intelligibility with Tanga (Batanga), which they call "Old Malimba". Most speak Duala as the local lingua franca.

References

Sawabantu languages
Languages of Cameroon